Redgrave may refer to:

People 
Redgrave family, a British family of actors and actresses
 Roy Redgrave (1908–1985)
 Michael Redgrave (1908–1985)
 Vanessa Redgrave (born 1937)
 Corin Redgrave (1939–2010)
 Lynn Redgrave (1943–2010)
 Jemma Redgrave (born 1965)
 Bill Redgrave (1881–1931), New Zealand cricketer
 Richard Redgrave (1804–1888), English landscape artist and painter
 Samuel Redgrave (1802–1876), English civil servant and writer on art
 Sidney Redgrave (1878–1958), Australian cricketer
 Steve Redgrave (born 1962), Olympic rowing champion
 William Redgrave (1903–1986), British sculptor

Fictional characters
 Antonio and Luka Redgrave, characters in the video game series Bayonetta 
 Tony Redgrave, an alias of Dante in the video game series  Devil May Cry

Places 
 Redgrave (railway point), British Columbia
 Redgrave, Suffolk, a village and civil parish in England containing the historic Redgrave Manor, Redgrave Park, Redgrave Hall, and Redgrave Park Farm
 Redgrave and Lopham Fens, a biological Site of Special Scientific Interest between Thelnetham in Suffolk and Diss in Norfolk
 Redgrave Pinsent Rowing Lake, a rowing lake in the United Kingdom
 Redgrave Theatre, Farnham, a theatre in Surrey from 1974 to 1998